Korhale  is a village in Rahata taluka of Ahmednagar district in the Indian state of Maharashtra. It is located in the north-west region of Rahata taluka.

The village is likely known for its historical purpose. During the age of British Empire and in the holkars empire the village is so called Subha. It means the whole agricultural tax and other types of taxes are gathered here. Some people think that the name Rahata appears to Rahata city due to visitors from puntamba to korhale or vice versa are stayed in this location so it has named Rahata.

Population
As per 2011 census, population of village is 4,798, of which 2,484 are male and 2,314 are female.

Economy
Agriculture and allied work is the main occupation of village.

Transport

Road
Shirdi Airport road passes through Korhale which connects to Shirdi. Nearby villages are connected to Korhale by village roads.

Rail
Shirdi is nearest railway station to village.

Air
Shirdi Airport is located near the village.

See also
List of villages in Rahata taluka

References 

Villages in Ahmednagar district